Mount Hope is a small town on the Flinders Highway on the west coast of Eyre Peninsula in South Australia. It was the terminus of a branch of the Eyre Peninsula Railway from Yeelanna from 1914 until but the line was closed and dismantled in 1966. The town was surveyed in 1916, and proposed to be named Mount Woakwine, but no action was taken to call it that. 

Mount Hope  was part of the traditional territory of the Nauo. It was first traversed by Europeans when Edward John Eyre passed that way in 1839. The school opened in 1911 and closed in 1974. In 1912, it had an undenominational Sunday School run by the same teacher as taught in the school for the rest of the week.

The 2016 Australian census which was conducted in August 2016 reports that Mount Hope had a population of 46 people.

Mount Hope is located within the federal division of Grey, the state electoral district of Flinders and the local government area of the District Council of Lower Eyre Peninsula.

See also
List of cities and towns in South Australia

References

Eyre Peninsula